Countdown: Jerusalem (a.k.a. Countdown: Armageddon) is a 2009 American science fiction thriller film direct-to-video film.

Plot
The film talks about the Seven signs of the Apocalypse, in this case created by a sect, which aims to take the company to the brink of a world war.

Before the searches for her daughter as a series of catastrophic disasters push a destabilized society toward the brink of global war.

The purge of the disaster film of faith, a mother and father search for their only child as a giant asteroid headed for Earth triggers a series of disaster events.

Cast
 Kim Little as Allison
 Clint Browning as Joseph
 Russell Reynolds as Itzhak
 Mark Hengst as Mark Thompson
 Audrey Latt as Mary
 April Wade as Cindy
 Spencer Scott as John Cosgrove
 Vivian Brunstein as Adi
 Danae Nason as Tina
 Matt Mercer as Lavi
 Cameron Cash as Abraham
 Dean Kreyling as Detective Strand
 Jose Prendes as Agent Malcolm Grant
 Matthew Farhat as Gianni
 Alexander Hatzidiakos as Romano

See also
Jerusalem Countdown
Book of Revelation
Seven seals

References

External links
 

2009 films
American science fiction thriller films
The Asylum films
Direct-to-video thriller films
Apocalyptic films
Films about evangelicalism
Films about the seven seals
2010s science fiction thriller films
Films scored by Joseph Trapanese
2000s English-language films
2000s American films